Belgium competed at the 1948 Summer Olympics in London, England. 152 competitors, 132 men and 20 women, took part in 77 events in 17 sports.

Medalists

Gold
 Gaston Reiff — Athletics, Men's 5.000 metres
 Léon Delathouwer, Eugène van Roosbroeck and Lode Wouters — Cycling, Men's Team Road Race

Silver
 Pierre Nihant — Cycling, Men's 1.000 metres Time Trial
 Joseph Vissers — Boxing, Men's Lightweight

Bronze
 Etienne Gailly — Athletics, Men's Marathon
 Lode Wouters — Cycling, Men's Individual Road Race
 Paul Valcke, André van de Werve de Vorsselaer, Georges de Bourguignon, Raymond Bru, Edouard Yves, and Henri Paternoster — Fencing, Men's Foil Team Competition

Athletics

Basketball

Men's Team Competition
Preliminary Round (Group B)
 Lost to South Korea (27-29)
 Lost to China (34-44)
 Defeated Iraq (98-20)
 Defeated Chile (38-36)
 Defeated Philippines (37-35)
Classification Matches
 9th/16th place: Defeated Hungary (walk-over)
 9th/12th place: Lost to Canada (40-45)
 11th/12th place: Defeated Philippines (38-34) → Eleventh place

Boxing

Canoeing

Cycling

Twelve cyclists, all men, represented Belgium in 1948.

Individual road race
 Lode Wouters
 Leon De Lathouwer
 Eugène Van Roosbroeck
 Liévin Lerno

Team road race
 Lode Wouters
 Leon De Lathouwer
 Eugène Van Roosbroeck
 Liévin Lerno

Sprint
 Ward Van de Velde

Time trial
 Pierre Nihant

Tandem
 Louis Van Schil
 Roger De Pauw

Team pursuit
 Jos De Beuckelaer
 Maurice Blomme
 Georges Vanbrabant
 Raphael Glorieux

Fencing

18 fencers, 15 men and 3 women, represented Belgium in 1948.

Men's foil
 Paul Valcke
 Henri Paternóster
 André Van De Werve De Vorsselaer

Men's team foil
 Georges de Bourguignon, Henri Paternóster, Édouard Yves, Raymond Bru, André Van De Werve De Vorsselaer, Paul Valcke

Men's épée
 Jean-Marie Radoux
 Charles Debeur
 Raoul Henkart

Men's team épée
 Raymond Stasse, Léopold Hauben, Raymond Bru, Jean-Marie Radoux, Raoul Henkart, Charles Debeur

Men's team sabre
 Robert Bayot, Georges de Bourguignon, Ferdinand Jassogne, Eugène Laermans, Marcel Nys, Édouard Yves

Women's foil
 Jenny Addams
 Adèle Christiaens
 Emilie Schwindt

Gymnastics

8 gymnasts, all female, represented Belgium in 1948.

Women's team
 Julienne Boudewijns
 Thérèse De Grijze
 Anna Jordaens
 Denise Parmentier
 Jenny Schumacher
 Yvonne Van Bets
 Albertine Van Roy-Moens
 Caroline Verbraecken-De Loose

Hockey

Modern pentathlon

Three male pentathletes represented Belgium in 1948.

 Louis Fauconnier
 Charles Vyt
 Raoul Mollet

Rowing

Belgium had four male rowers participate in two out of seven rowing events in 1948.

 Men's double sculls
 Ben Piessens
 Willy Collet

 Men's coxless pair
 Charles Van Antwerpen
 Jos Rosa

Sailing

Shooting

Three shooters represented Belgium in 1948.

50 metre pistol
 Marcel Lafortune

50 metre rifle
 Jacques Lafortune
 Jacques Delval
 Marcel Lafortune

Swimming

Water polo

Weightlifting

Wrestling

Art competitions

References

External links
Official Olympic Reports
International Olympic Committee results database

Nations at the 1948 Summer Olympics
1948
Olympic